The Districts in Colombia are cities that have a feature that highlights them, such as its location and trade, history or tourism. Arguably, the districts are special municipalities.

The first districts were Bogotá, Barranquilla, Cartagena and Santa Marta, which were created by the original version of the Constitution of 1991. However the Act 02 changed the Constitution and included as districts Cúcuta, Popayán, Tunja, Buenaventura, Turbo and Tumaco.

Significantly, it was not until 1954 when it created the first district was called Special District of Bogotá until 1991 when it takes its current name during this year and increase the numbers of districts in Colombia to 4 with the three major cities of northern Colombia: Barranquilla, Cartagena and Santa Marta, until July 2007 that increased to 10 with 3 cities and 3 seaports: capitals were: Cúcuta, Popayán and Tunja, the port were Turbo Antioquia and Uraba in the Pacific port: Buenaventura and Tumaco.

External links
 Acto Legislativo 02 - 6 de Julio de 2007 - Presidencia de la República

Geography of Colombia